Mancomunidad de Municipios de la Sierra del Segura is a comarca of the Province of Albacete, Spain. 

Comarcas of the Province of Albacete